Spen Valley High School is a high school situated in Liversedge, West Yorkshire, England.

The school's proportion of pupils who do not have learning difficulties and/or disabilities and those who have a statement of special educational needs exceeds the national average. The 15 - 20% of pupils from minority ethnic backgrounds are predominantly of Pakistani heritage. The proportion of pupils not entitled to free school meals is slightly under the national average. The school gained specialist status as a sports college in 2004. Artsmark and Sportsmark status are also held by the school, and in 2006 it was re-accredited as Investors in People.

References

External links
Spen Valley High School official website

Secondary schools in Kirklees
Foundation schools in Kirklees